Pearl River is a town in St. Tammany Parish in the U.S. state of Louisiana. The population was 2,506 at the 2010 U.S. census, and 2,618 at the 2020 population estimates program. It is part of the New Orleans–Metairie–Kenner metropolitan statistical area.

History
The community that is today Pearl River was originally known as Halloo, a moniker it reputedly garnered from loggers yelling to one another as they labored along the nearby Pearl River. The town was founded in 1859. Early Halloo was a small railroad town, located at the junction of the Northeastern and Poitevent and Favre's East Louisiana Railroads. In 1886 a train station was constructed at the site, and two years later Samuel Russ Poitevent (June 4, 1852 -  June 3, 1904), established the first store in the village. The community's name was first changed from Halloo (1859) to Pearl (1878), later to Pearlville (1881), and eventually Pearl River, in 1888, after the train station built in the town.

On July 13, 1898, the 200 citizens of Pearl River voted to petition the state of Louisiana for incorporation as the "Village of Pearl River", a request which was granted nearly a decade later, on May 24, 1906, by governor Newton Crain Blanchard, with G.W. Fuller as the first mayor. The village slowly modernized over the course of the next half century, acquiring the land for a courthouse in 1935 and a town hall ten years later. Pearl River Junior High was opened in 1963, but the building was made into a police training academy in 2005. In 1964, the village insignia was replaced, as the newly minted "town" laid claim to 1,500 residents, a designation that lives on today, in the town of about 2,500.

Geography
Pearl River is located at  (30.371096, -89.751139), in southern Louisiana in the Greater New Orleans area.

Demographics

At of the 2020 United States census, there were 2,565 people, 902 households, and 639 families residing in the town. At the 2019 American Community Survey, 92.5% of the population was White, 3.8% Black and African American, 3.3% American Indian and Alaska Native, and 0.5% from two or more races. There were was a median household income of $56,061 and families lived in 902 housing units. An estimated 13.5% of the population lived at or below the poverty line in 2019.

Education
Residents are zoned to St. Tammany Parish Public Schools schools.
 1-5: Riverside Elementary School (unincorporated St. Tammany Parish)
Riverside was first opened in 1987 and originally only had grades PreK through 3rd grade. Mrs. Mary Lou Jordan served as Principal of the school from 1994 until her retirement in June 2018. Mrs. Jordan started at Riverside its opening year as a second grade teacher. Mrs. Patti Holden was given the title of Principal following Mrs. Jordan's retirement.
 6-8: Creekside Junior High School (unincorporated St. Tammany Parish)
Creekside was opened in 2003 when the town decided to turn Pearl River Junior High into a police training academy. Lisa Virga has been the principal since 2006. Adam Barrois has served as the Vice Principal since 2011.
 9-12: Pearl River High School (Pearl River)
Pearl River High School was first opened in 1968 with Robert Harper and Sigvart Halvorsen, School Board Members responsible for establishing the school.  Mr. E.W. Rowley served as principal until 1982. And PRHS would see 5 more principals through its time. Mr. Michael "Mike" Winkler has served as principal since 2000. Linda Fussell has been a vice president since 2011. Clark Hershey has been the other vice principal since 2016.

Notable people
A. G. Crowe, a native of New Orleans, served 8 years in the Louisiana House of Representatives and 8 years in the Louisiana Senate (2000-2016) as well as a Member of the St. Tammany Parish School Board.
Owen Hale, former Drummer for Lynyrd Skynyrd

References

Towns in Louisiana
Towns in St. Tammany Parish, Louisiana
Towns in New Orleans metropolitan area